David Wheeler (born 20 March 1963), better known as David Thewlis, is an English actor, filmmaker, and author. He is known as a character actor and has appeared in a wide variety of genres in both film and television. He has received Cannes Film Festival Award and nominations for two BAFTA Awards, Golden Globe Award, Primetime Emmy Award and a Screen Actors Guild Award. 

Thewlis made his film debut in Little Dorrit (1987) and acted in the Mike Leigh films Life is Sweet (1990) and Naked (1993), winning the Cannes Film Festival Award for Best Actor for the latter. He then appeared in films such as Black Beauty (1994), Restoration (1995), James and the Giant Peach (1996), Dragonheart (1996), and Seven Years in Tibet (1997). He became more widely known to film audiences for his roles as Remus Lupin in the Harry Potter franchise (2004–2011) and Ares / Sir Patrick Morgan in Wonder Woman (2017). Other film roles include Kingdom of Heaven (2005), The Boy in the Striped Pyjamas (2008), War Horse (2011), The Theory of Everything (2014), Anomalisa (2015), I'm Thinking of Ending Things (2020), and Enola Holmes 2 (2022). 

Thewlis' most notable television roles include V. M. Varga in the third series of FX's Fargo (2017), the voice of the Shame Wizard in the Netflix animated sitcoms Big Mouth (2017–present) and Human Resources (2022–present), Christopher Edwards in the HBO miniseries Landscapers (2021), and John Dee in the Netflix drama series The Sandman (2022). His performance in Fargo earned him nominations for an Emmy, a Golden Globe, and a Critics' Choice Award.

Early life
Thewlis was born David Wheeler in Blackpool on 20 March 1963, the son of Maureen (née Thewlis) and Alec Raymond Wheeler. His parents ran a toy and wallpaper shop. He has an older sibling and a younger sibling. As a teenager, he played in a rock band called QED and played lead guitar with a punk rock band called Door 66. He was educated at Highfield High School in Blackpool's Marton area. He later enrolled in the Guildhall School of Music and Drama in London, graduating in 1984.

Career

Acting
Using his mother's maiden name as his professional surname to distinguish himself from various other people named David Wheeler, Thewlis had a minor role in an episode of the 1980s sitcom Up the Elephant and Round the Castle. He also appeared in a 1985 episode of the BBC sitcom Only Fools and Horses, 'It's Only Rock and Roll', as a member of Rodney's short-lived band. His first professional role was in the play Buddy Holly at the Regal in Greenwich.

Thewlis's breakout role was Naked (1993), as the main character, Johnny, a homeless, highly intelligent, embittered, rambling street philosopher, for which Thewlis was named Best Actor by the National Society of Film Critics (United States), the London Film Critics Circle, the Evening Standard, the New York Film Critics' Circle and the Cannes Film Festival. That same year, he appeared on television as a sexual predator named James Jackson in Prime Suspect 3, opposite Helen Mirren and Ciarán Hinds. Before that, his first television appearance was in Valentine Park.

During the 1990s, Thewlis appeared in a variety of films, mostly fantasy and period, including Restoration (1995), Black Beauty (1994), Total Eclipse (1995) with Leonardo DiCaprio, The Island of Dr. Moreau (1996), Dragonheart (1996), and Seven Years in Tibet (1997), opposite Brad Pitt. He was nominated for a British Independent Film Award for Divorcing Jack (1998), and played Clov in a television film of Samuel Beckett's Endgame (2000). Notable appearances also include Bernardo Bertolucci's Besieged (1998), the Coen brothers’ The Big Lebowski (1998), and Paul McGuigan's Gangster No. 1 (2000), opposite Paul Bettany and Malcolm McDowell.

He auditioned for the role of Quirinus Quirrell in the Chris Columbus directed film Harry Potter and the Philosopher's Stone, but the part went to Ian Hart. Despite missing out on the first film, he was cast in 2004 as Professor Remus Lupin in Harry Potter and the Prisoner of Azkaban. He did not have to audition as he was director Alfonso Cuarón's first choice for the role. Thewlis reprised the role in four other films in the series.

He appeared as an SS Commandant of a Nazi death camp and father of the main character in The Boy in the Striped Pyjamas, which was well received. Other credits include Ridley Scott's Kingdom of Heaven (2005), Terrence Malick's The New World (2005), and The Omen (2006).

Thewlis played the late Dr Michael Aris, husband of Nobel Prize laureate Aung San Suu Kyi of Burma, with Malaysian actress Michelle Yeoh as Suu Kyi, in the biopic The Lady directed by Luc Besson. In 2012, he received an International Festival of Independent Cinema Off Plus Camera Award. In the same year, he also played in Separate We Come, Separate We Go, directed by Harry Potter co-star Bonnie Wright.

In June 2015, Thewlis was reported to be filming scenes for a Donald Crowhurst biopic, The Mercy, on the beach at Teignmouth, Devon, playing Donald Crowhurst's press agent, Rodney Hallworth, while Colin Firth is playing Donald Crowhurst. He also starred in Regression, a thriller released in autumn 2015. In September 2015, Thewlis starred as Inspector Goole in Helen Edmundson's BBC TV adaptation of J. B. Priestley's An Inspector Calls. In October 2015, he played King Duncan in the film Macbeth.

Thewlis portrayed Ares in Wonder Woman (2017), the DC Comics film featuring the character of the same name. He briefly reprised his role as Ares in Justice League (2017). That same year, he appeared as V. M. Varga, the main antagonist of the third season of Fargo. His performance was critically acclaimed, and earned him nominations for the Primetime Emmy Award, Critics' Choice Television Award and Golden Globe Award as a supporting actor.

Thewlis starred in the Netflix film I'm Thinking of Ending Things (2020), the HBO miniseries Landscapers (2021), and the Netflix drama series The Sandman (2022).

Filmmaking
Thewlis directed Hello, Hello, Hello in 1995, for which he was nominated for a BAFTA Award for Best Short Film. He also wrote, directed and starred in the feature Cheeky (2003).

Writing
Thewlis's black comedy novel set in the art world, The Late Hector Kipling, was published by Simon & Schuster in 2007. His second book, "Shooting Martha", was published by Weidenfeld & Nicolson in 2021.

Personal life 
Thewlis was married to Welsh actress Sara Sugarman from 1992 until their divorce in 1994. He then had a brief relationship with English actress Kate Hardie. He was in a relationship with English actress Anna Friel from 2001 until late 2010. Their daughter, Gracie, was born on 9 July 2005 and later became an actress.

Thewlis married French designer Hermine Poitou on 5 August 2016. They live in Sunningdale, Berkshire.

Filmography

Film

Television

Video games

Awards and nominations

References

External links

 

1963 births
Living people
20th-century English male actors
21st-century English male actors
Alumni of the Guildhall School of Music and Drama
Cannes Film Festival Award for Best Actor winners
English male film actors
English male television actors
English male Shakespearean actors
English male stage actors
English male voice actors
Male actors from Lancashire
People from Blackpool